Year 344 (CCCXLIV) was a leap year starting on Sunday (link will display the full calendar) of the Julian calendar. At the time, it was known as the Year of the Consulship of Leontius and Bonosus (or, less frequently, year 1097 Ab urbe condita). The denomination 344 for this year has been used since the early medieval period, when the Anno Domini calendar era became the prevalent method in Europe for naming years.

Events 
 By place 
 Roman Empire 
 The Eastern Roman Emperor Constantius II campaigns in eastern Mesopotamia, against the Sassanid Persians.
 Battle of Singara: The Roman army under Constantius wins a close victory, at the strongly fortified city of Singara (Mesopotamia). His enemy, King Shapur II, is forced to lift the siege, and withdraw the Persian army. 
 Shapur II, for the second time, besieges the Roman fortress of Nisibis in eastern Mesopotamia, but is repulsed by forces under General Lucilianus.

 Asia 
 Jin Mudi, age 1, succeeds his father Jin Kangdi as emperor of China. His mother, Empress Dowager Chu, becomes the ruling authority at court, and serves as regent.
 Gye becomes king of the Korean kingdom of Baekje.

 By topic 
 Art 
 The making of a detail of Admonitions of the Imperial Instructress to Court Ladies (attributed to Gu Kaizhi and being from the Six Dynasties period) begins (approximate year) and is completed in 406. It is now kept at the British Museum, London.

 Religion 
 Bishop Eustorgius I brings relics of the Three Magi from Constantinople to Milan, according to a 12th century legend.

Births 
 Gu Kaizhi, Chinese painter (approximate date)
 Kumārajīva, Buddhist monk and translator (d. 413) 
 Mary of Egypt, patron Saint (approximate date)
 Wang Xianzhi, Chinese calligrapher (d. 386)
 Zhang Yaoling, ruler of Former Liang (d. 355)

Deaths 
 April 14
 Chusdazat, Syrian Orthodox priest, martyr and saint
 Pusai, Syrian Orthodox priest, martyr and saint
 August 20 – Heliodorus of Bet Zabdai, bishop and martyr
 November 17 – Jin Kangdi, emperor of the Jin Dynasty (b. 322)

Date unknown 
 Biryu of Baekje, king of Baekje (Three Kingdoms of Korea)

References